Motormouth is a reality show on VH1, presented by Zane Lamprey, which showcases people unknowingly being taped in their cars while singing a song. It began airing October 26, 2004. The skits would end when the victim stopped and Lamprey would appear to tell them "You've been Motormouth-ed".

Episodes

See also
Scare Tactics

References

External links
Motormouth on VH1.com

2000s American reality television series
VH1 original programming
VH1 music shows
2000s American music television series
2004 American television series debuts
2004 American television series endings